Frank Zenker (born 29 May 1973, Frankfurt, Germany), better known by his stage name Scot Project, is a German hard trance DJ and record producer. He also produces musical pieces under aliases such as "Arome" and "TOCS."

Biography
Scot Project learned to mix techno at the age of 13, and he got his first break in 1986, playing break beat in a youth club in Frankfurt. During the 1990s, he became resident DJ of several clubs in and around Frankfurt.

Scot Project's success began in 1994, when his first track "X" was released; this was followed closely by "U I Got A Feeling," in 1995. The latter track peaked at #66 in the UK Singles Chart. It was followed by the 1998 UK hit, "Y (How Deep is Your Love)" which made #57.

In 2002, Frank Zenker and Kai Winter (Derb) created the Druck Records label.

In 2004, Scot's track "L (Want Your Love)" took over from Eric Prydz's "Call On Me" at #1 in the charts.

In 2010, Scot Project received a genre Beatport Artist Award, and has had the honour of being supported by many legends in the world such as Tiësto, Ferry Corsten, Paul van Dyk, Armin van Buuren, Paul Oakenfold, Judge Jules, Yoji Biomehanika and many more.

Discography

Studio albums

References

External links
DJ Scot Project's official site
DJ Scot Project discography at Discogs.

Scot project
German electronic musicians
Living people
1973 births
Electronic dance music DJs